Sandral railway station 
() is  located in  Pakistan.The Sandral is a small village of District Khushab in Punjab, Pakistan.

See also
 List of railway stations in Pakistan
 Pakistan Railways

References

External links

Railway stations in Pakistan